Leon Herbert is a British actor. Herbert is known for appearances in films including Salome's Last Dance (1988), Scandal (1989), Batman (1989), Alien 3 (1992), Double X: The Name of the Game (1992), Point of No Return (1993), The Girl with the Hungry Eyes (1995), Fierce Creatures (1997), Lucinda's Spell (1998), South West 9 (2001), 9 Dead Gay Guys (2002) and Dark Floors (2008).

Herbert made his directorial debut with the 2003 film Emotional Backgammon. He also appeared on the television series Come Dine with Me, as well as an episode of the BBC soap opera Doctors as Lenny Rutter.

References

External links

British male film actors
British film directors
British film producers
British male screenwriters
Black British male actors
Living people
English people of Saint Kitts and Nevis descent
1955 births